A series of cassettes that Island Records released. The inserts read "The complete album is on side one. It is also on side two but if you prefer to record your own programme on side two just record in the normal way and our recording will be automatically erased. Plus it is chrome tape to ensure top quality recording. 1+1. One side what you like. One side whatever you like."

Launched on 13 February 1981

Releases
John Cale: Music for a New Society
John Martyn: Solid Air
John Martyn: Grace and Danger
Kid Creole & the Coconuts - Tropical Gangsters
Ultravox: Systems of Romance
Ultravox: Three Into One
U2 - Boy
Cat Stevens - Greatest Hits
Robert Palmer - Clues
Gwen Guthrie - Gwen Guthrie
Grace Jones - Nightclubbing
Tom Petty & The Heartbreakers - Tom Petty & The Heartbreakers

References

External links

Products introduced in 1981
Island Records albums